Frazier Lake is a seasonal lake in Gallatin County, Montana in the Bridger Range in south central Montana.

References

Bodies of water of Gallatin County, Montana
Lakes of Montana